Sybille Schönrock (born 28 July 1964) is a former butterfly swimmer from East Germany. At age fifteen she won the silver medal in the women's 200m butterfly at the boycotted 1980 Summer Olympics in Moscow, USSR.

References
databaseOlympics

1964 births
Living people
German female swimmers
Female butterfly swimmers
Swimmers at the 1980 Summer Olympics
Olympic swimmers of East Germany
Olympic silver medalists for East Germany
Place of birth missing (living people)
Medalists at the 1980 Summer Olympics
Olympic silver medalists in swimming